Cyclocardia borealis, or the northern cardita, is a species of bivalve mollusc in the family Carditidae. It can be found along the Atlantic coast of North America, ranging from the Arctic Ocean to Cape Hatteras.

References

Carditidae
Bivalves described in 1831